Jerzy Eugeniusz Zborowski (nom de guerre: Jeremi, Jurek, Jurek Kowalski, Kajman Okularnik, Jurek Żoliborski) was born on 26 July 1922 in Warsaw and died in September 1944 in Warsaw, Poland).

He was a Polish Scoutmaster (harcmistrz), scouting resistance activist, porucznik of the Armia Krajowa and commander of the Battalion Parasol during the Warsaw Uprising.

Zborowski was a partisan during Operation Arsenal and the assassin of Franz Bürkl in 1943.

Awards
 Cross of Valour (Krzyż Walecznych), twice
 Gold Cross of Merit with Swords (Krzyż Zasługi z Mieczami)
 Silver Cross of Virtuti Militari

References
1994 Uprising Museum: Jerzy Zborowski

1922 births
1944 deaths
1943 crimes
Polish Army officers
Home Army officers
Polish Scouts and Guides
Recipients of the Silver Cross of the Virtuti Militari
Recipients of the Cross of Valour (Poland)
Recipients of the Cross of Merit with Swords (Poland)
Warsaw Uprising insurgents
Resistance members killed by Nazi Germany